Trollsteinrundhøe is a mountain in Lom Municipality in Innlandet county, Norway. The mountain is surrounded by several other notable mountains including Finnshalspiggen, Gråhøe, Svartholshøe, and Nørdre Trollsteinhøe to the north; Smådalshøe to the northeast; Grotbreahesten to the east; Trollsteineggi and Glittertinden to the south; and Lauvhøe to the northwest.

See also
List of mountains of Norway

References

Lom, Norway
Jotunheimen
Mountains of Innlandet